Robert Emmet Hannegan (June 30, 1903 – October 6, 1949) was an American politician who served as Commissioner of Internal Revenue from October 1943 to January 1944. He also served as chairman of the Democratic National Committee from 1944 to 1947 and United States Postmaster General from 1945 to 1947. After his political career, in 1947, Hannegan and partner Fred Saigh purchased the St. Louis Cardinals of Major League Baseball. But Hannegan, ill with heart disease, sold his share in the team to Saigh a few months before his death.

Political career
A power broker in the St. Louis Democratic Party allied with Senator Bennett Clark, Hannegan helped save the political career of Harry S. Truman in 1940 following the tax fraud conviction of Truman's ally, Kansas City boss Tom Pendergast. Hannegan supported Truman for re-election to the U.S. Senate when he was challenged in the Democratic primary by Governor Lloyd C. Stark and Maurice M. Milligan, who both sought credit for bringing down Pendergast. Truman re-won the seat with increased support in St. Louis, particularly from Catholic neighborhoods in which Hannegan wielded considerable influence. In his second term, Truman achieved national prominence by chairing a Senate committee investigating government waste in defense contracts. When Franklin D. Roosevelt offered Truman the position of DNC chairman, Truman declined but recommended Hannegan.

In 1944, Roosevelt appointed Hannegan, who had been the Collector of Internal Revenue in St. Louis, to the DNC after testing him by asking for his help with his income tax return. As Democratic chairman, Hannegan was responsible for brokering the deal that made Truman Roosevelt's running mate that year. Shortly before the 1944 Democratic National Convention, Roosevelt famously sent Hannegan a letter stating he would be "happy to run with" either Truman or Supreme Court Justice William O. Douglas. Vice President Henry A. Wallace nearly won the nomination, but Hannegan worked feverishly to secure Truman's nomination. Hannegan later joked he wanted his tombstone inscribed with the words "Here lies the man who stopped Henry Wallace from becoming President of the United States."

Though plagued with ill health for much of his tenure as party chairman, Hannegan emphasized voter turnout efforts in Roosevelt's 1944 re-election campaign and prevented an upset by Thomas Dewey, who won a surprising 46 percent of the popular vote that year. He promoted a liberal policy agenda for the national party and was a strong advocate of labor unions. Hannegan stepped down as chairman after Democrats suffered Congressional losses in the 1946 midterm elections, but his ideological focus at the helm of the party contributed to Truman's upset win in the Presidential election of 1948, and influenced his Fair Deal proposals.

Death
Hannegan died in St. Louis, Missouri, on October 6, 1949. He is interred in Calvary Cemetery in St. Louis, Missouri.

In popular culture
Hannegan was mentioned in the film Miracle on 34th Street in his role as Postmaster General. Therefore, in the film, by implication, he was responsible for affirming that central character Mr. Kris Kringle was the one and only Santa Claus.

Hannegan was portrayed by actor John Finn in the 1995 film Truman.

References

External links

 Truman Library Hannegan papers

|-

|-

1903 births
1949 deaths
20th-century American politicians
Baseball executives
Burials at Calvary Cemetery (St. Louis)
Catholics from Missouri
Democratic National Committee chairs
Major League Baseball owners
Major League Baseball team presidents
Missouri Democrats
Pendergast era
Politicians from St. Louis
St. Louis Cardinals owners
Saint Louis University School of Law alumni
Truman administration cabinet members
United States Postmasters General